Giorgio DeLuca is a founder of the gourmet grocery store Dean & DeLuca ("a landmark for culinary adventurers") with his partner Joel Dean. Before that, DeLuca owned a cheese shop on Prince Street in New York City which he opened in 1973, after a brief career teaching history in the city's public school system.

DeLuca is now the owner of the restaurant Giorgione on Spring Street in SoHo.

References

External links 
 Dean & DeLuca - Official site of Dean & DeLuca
 Giorgio DeLuca - Official site of Giorgio DeLuca
 Giorgione - Official site of Giorgione

Living people
Year of birth missing (living people)
Place of birth missing (living people)
Businesspeople from New York City
American people of Italian descent